Arthur G. Robinson (born 1936) was an American bridge player from Villanova, Pennsylvania. During the 1960s he played on three North America or USA open teams that were runners-up to Italy (the Blue Team) in world championships. Robert Jordan was his regular partner on all three occasions.

Robinson's first "national"-level victory in the American Contract Bridge League may have been his greatest. He was one of "four young bridge experts led by [Jordan]" who won the annual Vanderbilt Cup in 1961, when it was contested in a 64- double-elimination tournament. Their teammates were Charlie Coon, manager of the Boston Chess Club, and Eric Murray, a Toronto lawyer. Jordan–Robinson went on to qualify for the 6-man North America team in the 1963 Bermuda Bowl where they finished second to Italy's Blue Team—as Coon–Murray had qualified in 1962 with the same result.

Bridge accomplishments

Wins

 North American Bridge Championships (5)
 Silodor Open Pairs (1) 1962 
 Vanderbilt (2) 1961, 1968 
 Reisinger (2) 1966, 1967

Runners-up

 North American Bridge Championships
 Master Individual (1) 1960 
 Vanderbilt (1) 1965 
 Reisinger (1) 1961

References

External links
 

1936 births
American contract bridge players
Bermuda Bowl players
People from Delaware County, Pennsylvania
Place of birth missing (living people)
Living people